Lauren Chief Elk (born 1987) is a Native American feminist educator and writer.

Biography
Lauren Chief Elk was born in San Jose, California, in 1987. She is Assiniboine and Blackfeet from Fort Belknap, Montana, raised in San Francisco, California. She also lived in other parts of the Bay Area and also later in Oregon. She comes from a family that is in academia. Her mother, teaches at the university Lauren attended.

She has worked at San Francisco City Hall, planned SlutWalk and AIDS Walk, and is a legal assistant. She is the co-founder of Save Wiyabi Project and the Media Coordinator of Anonymous' Operation Thunderbird.

Lauren Chief Elk is also one of the three founding women that began the #GiveYourMoneyToWomen Twitter hashtag on social media, along with professional dominatrices @LadyLuxatrix and @ICONOCLASTIAE.

She was involved with the 2007 De Anza rape investigation, as one of three women soccer players who interrupted the gang rape. She testified against ten members of the De Anza College men's baseball team, but the criminal case was dismissed due to insufficient evidence and difficulties in positively identifying the participants. The victim pursued damages against two alleged participants, losing a civil trial presided over by Santa Clara County Superior Court Judge Aaron Persky.

Save Wiyabi Project 
She co-founded the Save Wiyabi Project in August 2011 with Jessa Rae, which focuses on serving Native American women who have experienced sexual violence and creating solutions in urban and rural environments. The project was created as a social media campaign to assist in the Violence Against Women Act reauthorization with full tribal provisions.

In an interview with As Us Journal, she said that she is motivated by the progress she has seen in Indian Country on VAWA, especially the people from Indian Country in Montana who have been moved to share their stories and experiences with sexual violence and healing.

With this project they started a "All Nations Rising" VDay movement to highlight indigenous women within the One Billion Rising events.

#GiveYourMoneyToWomen
Chief Elk co-founded the Twitter hashtag #GiveYourMoneyToWomen, which encourages men on Twitter to directly give money to women as a way of balancing gender-based income inequality.

Jennifer Schaffer explains, "Women were banding together to demand payment for all the emotional work we do that goes completely unpaid—the exhausting work of being a tolerant, gentle, nurturing, listening woman in our relationships with men, at all times. Women put up with a lot of bullshit, and we have a science-backed term for it: emotional labor. And as with any kind of labor, women are now ready and eager to get paid."

Writing
She contributed an article to Salon.com in 2014, another to Truthout in 2014, and has posted half a dozen articles on Model View Culture. She was banned from Twitter in December 2016 and has stated that she will rely on Instagram instead. As of July, 2017, Chief Elk-Young Bear was tweeting under the handle @elle_chiefelk.  This account was also suspended because the new account violated the Twitter terms of service prohibiting the creation of new accounts to avoid Twitter bans.

References

Living people
Native American writers
1987 births